Hilda Margaret Bruce (5 April 1903 – 2 November 1974) was a British zoologist, best known for her discovery of the Bruce effect, a pheromonal behaviour observed in many rodent species. Her work on the control of fertility earned her the Oliver Bird Medal.

Biography
Hilda Bruce was born on 5 April 1903. She was educated at St Leonards School. In 1923, she began her tertiary studies at King's College for Women, where she received a BSc in Household and Social Science, and another in Physiology. In 1928, Bruce joined the National Institute for Medical Research (NIMR) at Mount Vernon, Hampstead. Her early research was dedicated towards the understanding of Vitamin D; she also jointly published the first article describing the breeding characteristics of the golden hamster. In 1933, Bruce was employed by the Pharmaceutical Society, where she continued her research on Vitamin D. In 1941, she was appointed to set up the Cod Liver Oil (Poultry) Standardisation Laboratory. In 1944, she returned to the NIMR, where she formulated specialised diets for laboratory animals.

From the early 1950s, Bruce turned her attentions towards sexual behaviour in rodents, particularly the Whitten effect. In 1959, she published her discovery of what is now called the Bruce effect, the termination of pregnancy following exposure to the scent of an unfamiliar male. Bruce retired from the NIMR in 1963, but continued part-time research, variously on nutrients, development and pheromones, at the Department of Investigative Medicine in Cambridge. She continued work at the Department until 1973. In her later years, Bruce largely used a wheelchair, having been afflicted with worsening rheumatoid arthritis since 1942.

Bruce effect

Throughout the 1950s, Bruce studied sexual behaviour in laboratory mice, with a particular interest in oestrus synchronisation. In one experiment, she housed newly mated pregnant females with male mice that were not the father of the carried embryo. As a result, the rate of miscarriages increased, these females subsequently returning to oestrus and mating with the new male. No increased rate of miscarriages occurred when pregnant mice were paired with juvenile or castrated mice.

Her colleague Alan Parkes, who had recruited her to the NIMR in 1944, helped her to pursue the initial findings that eventually lead to this discovery.

The National Institute for Medical Research
Following the isolation of pure vitamin D in 1931, Bruce worked in collaboration with Askew, Philpot and Webster in the Department of Biological Standards, determining the stability of the pure substance. At this time, Bruce was also working with Dr Callow in the Department of Physiology, Pharmacology and Biochemistry, determining the healing effect of vitamin D in rats with rickets.

Publications

References

British mammalogists
English zoologists
1903 births
1974 deaths
Women mammalogists
Women zoologists
National Institute for Medical Research faculty
Alumni of King's College London
People educated at St Leonards School
20th-century Argentine people
20th-century British zoologists
20th-century British women scientists